Mayday is a band from Omaha, Nebraska, on the Saddle Creek Records label, led by Ted Stevens, also of Cursive and Lullaby for the Working Class.

Band members
Ted Stevens
Tiffany Kowalski
Daniel J. McCarthy
Pat Oakes

Discography

Albums
Old Blood (2002 · Saddle Creek Records)
I Know Your Troubles Been Long (2003 · Bar/None Records [cd], Greyday Records [lp])
Bushido Karaoke (2005 · Saddle Creek Records)

Compilations
Various Artists - Saddle Creek 50 (2002 · Saddle Creek Records)
Various Artists - Lagniappe (2005 · Saddle Creek Records)
Various Artists - 20 Nights of Wine and Song (2005 · Greyday Productions)

External links
Saddle Creek Records

BarNone Records
Greyday Records

Indie rock musical groups from Nebraska
Musical groups from Omaha, Nebraska
Saddle Creek Records artists